Chagossian creole (also , , or just ) is a French-based creole that was still spoken in 1994 by the 1,800 or so Chagossians, the former inhabitants of the Chagos Archipelago evicted in the early 1970s. It is currently spoken mainly in Mauritius and the Seychelles.  There is also a small minority community speaking the language in the United Kingdom.

See also 

 Creole language
 Agalega creole
 Mauritian creole
 Rodriguan creole

References

French-based pidgins and creoles
British Indian Ocean Territory culture
Languages of the African diaspora
Chagos Archipelago